The Dornier Do 335 Pfeil ("Arrow") was a heavy fighter built by Dornier for Germany during World War II. The two-seater trainer version was called Ameisenbär ("anteater"). The Pfeils performance was predicted to be better than other twin-engine designs due to its unique push-pull configuration and the lower aerodynamic drag of the in-line alignment of the two engines. It was Nazi Germany's fastest piston-engined aircraft of World War II. The Luftwaffe was desperate to get the design into operational use, but delays in engine deliveries meant that only a handful were delivered before the war ended.

Design and development
The origins of the Do 335 trace back to World War I when Claude Dornier designed a number of flying boats featuring remotely driven propellers and later, due to problems with the drive shafts, tandem engines. Tandem engines were used on most of the multi-engine Dornier flying boats that followed, including the highly successful Do J Wal and the gigantic Do X. The remote propeller drive, intended to eliminate parasitic drag from the engine entirely, was tried in the innovative but unsuccessful Do 14, and elongated, tubular drive shafts as later used in the Do 335 saw use in the rear engines of the four-engined, twinned tandem-layout Do 26 flying boat.

There are many advantages to this design over the more traditional system of placing one engine on each wing, the most important being power from two engines with the frontal area (and thus drag) of a single-engine design, allowing for higher performance. It also keeps the weight of the twin powerplants near, or on, the aircraft centerline, increasing the roll rate compared to a traditional twin. In addition, a single engine failure does not lead to asymmetric thrust, and in normal flight there is no net torque, so the plane is easy to handle. The four-surface set of cruciform tail surfaces in the Do 335's rear fuselage design included a ventral vertical fin–rudder assembly that projected downwards from the extreme rear of the fuselage, to protect the rear propeller from an accidental ground strike on takeoff. The presence of the rear pusher propeller also mandated the provision for an ejection seat for safe escape from a damaged aircraft, and designing the rear propeller and dorsal fin mounts to use explosive bolts to jettison them before an ejection was attempted – as well as twin canopy jettison levers, one per side located to either side of the forward cockpit interior just below the sills of the five-panel windscreen's sides, to jettison the canopy from atop the cockpit before ejection.

In 1939, Dornier was busy working on the P.59 high-speed bomber project, which featured the tandem engine layout. In 1940, he commissioned a test aircraft, closely modeled on the airframe of the early versions of the Dornier Do 17 bomber but only 40% of the size of the larger bomber, with no aerodynamic bodies of any sort on the wing panels (the original Do 17 had twin engine nacelles on its wings) and fitted with a retractable tricycle landing gear to validate his concept for turning the rear pusher propeller with an engine located far away from it, through the use of a long tubular driveshaft. This aircraft, the Göppingen Gö 9, showed no unforeseen difficulties with this arrangement, but work on the P.59 was stopped in early 1940 when Hermann Göring ordered the cancellation of all projects that would not be completed within a year or so.

In May 1942, Dornier submitted an updated version with a  bombload as the P.231, in response to a requirement for a single seat, Schnellbomber-like high-speed bomber/intruder. The P.231 proposal was selected as the winner after beating rival designs from Arado, Junkers, and Blohm & Voss. A development contract was awarded, by the RLM issuing the Dornier firm the airframe approval number 8-335, for what would become known as the Do 335. In autumn 1942, Dornier was told that the Do 335 was no longer required, and instead a multi-role fighter based on the same general layout would be accepted. This delayed the prototype delivery as it was modified for the new role.

The use of a nose-mount annular radiator for the forward engine (much like a Jumo 211-powered Ju 88, or Jumo 213-powered Focke-Wulf Fw 190D-9) and a ventral-fuselage mount airscooped radiator installation for cooling the rear engine made the aircraft look distinctive. When fitted with DB 603A engines delivering  it had a pair of the largest inverted V12 aircraft engines mass-produced during the Third Reich's existence. The Do 335 V1 first prototype, bearing the Stammkennzeichen (factory radio code) of CP+UA, flew on 26 October 1943 under the control of Flugkapitän Hans Dieterle, a regular Heinkel test pilot and later primary Dornier test pilot. However, several problems during the initial flight of the Do 335 would continue to plague the aircraft through most of its short history. Issues were found with the weak landing gear and with the main gear's wheel well doors, resulting in them being removed for the remainder of the V1's test flights. The Do 335 V1 made 27 flights, flown by three different pilots. During these test flights the second prototype, V2 (Werk Nr 230002) CP+UB, was completed and made its first flight on 31 December 1943, again under the control of Dieterle. New to the V2 were upgraded DB 603A-2 engines, and several refinements learned from the test flights of the V1 as well as further windtunnel testing. On 20 January 1944, the Do 335 V3 (W.Nr. 230004), CP+UC was completed and flown for its first time by Werner Altrogge. The V3 was powered by the new pre-production DB 603G-0 engines which could produce  at take-off and featured a slightly redesigned canopy which included twin rear-view mirrors in blisters, one in each of two matching side panels of the well-framed, eleven-panel main canopy's openable section. Following the flights of the V3, in mid January 1944, RLM ordered five more prototypes (V21–V25), to be built as night fighters. By this time, more than 60 hours of flight time had been put on the Do 335 and reports showed it to be a good handling, but more importantly, very fast aircraft, described by Generalfeldmarschall Erhard Milch himself as "...holding its own in speed and altitude with the P-38 and it does not suffer from engine reliability issues". The Do 335 was scheduled to begin mass construction, with the initial order of 120 preproduction aircraft to be manufactured by Dornier-Werke Friedrichshafen (DWF) to be completed no later than March 1946. This number included a number of bombers, destroyers (heavy fighters), and several yet to be developed variants. At the same time,  Dornier-Werke München (DWM) was scheduled to build over 2,000 Do 335s in various models, due for delivery in March 1946 as well.

On 23 May 1944, Hitler, as part of the developing Jägernotprogramm (Emergency Fighter Program) directive, which took effect on 3 July, ordered maximum priority to be given to Do 335 production. The main production line was intended to be at Manzell, but a bombing raid in March destroyed the tooling and forced Dornier to set up a new line at Oberpfaffenhofen. The decision was made, along with the rapid shut-down of many other military aircraft development programs, to cancel the Heinkel He 219 night fighter, which also used the DB 603 engines (in well-unitized installations), and use its production facilities for the Do 335 as well. However, Ernst Heinkel managed to delay, and eventually ignore, its implementation, continuing to produce examples of the He 219A.

At least 16 prototype Do 335s were known to have flown (V1–V12, W.Nr 230001-230012 and Muster-series prototypes M13–M17, W.Nr 230013-230017) on a number of DB603 engine subtypes including the DB 603A, A-2, G-0, E and E-1. The first preproduction Do 335 (A-0s) starting with W.Nr 240101, Stammkennzeichen VG+PG, were delivered in July 1944. Approximately 22 preproduction aircraft were thought to have been completed and flown before the end of the war, including approximately 11 A-0s converted to A-11s for training purposes. One such aircraft was transferred to the Royal Aircraft Establishment at Farnborough, and later, after a rear-engine fire burnt through the elevator controls during a flight, crashed onto a local school.

Flight tests

The first 10 Do 335 A-0s were delivered for testing in May. By late 1944, the Do 335 A-1 was on the production line. It was similar to the A-0 but with the uprated DB 603E-1 engines of some  take-off power rating apiece on 87 octane "B4" lignite-derived synthetic fuel, and two underwing hardpoints for additional bombs, drop tanks or guns.

Delivery commenced in January 1945. When the United States Army overran the Oberpfaffenhofen factory in late April 1945, only 11 Do 335 A-1 single-seat fighter-bombers and two Do 335 A-12 trainers had been completed.

French ace Pierre Clostermann claimed the first Allied combat encounter with a Pfeil in April 1945. He describes leading a flight of four Hawker Tempests from No. 3 Squadron RAF over northern Germany when they came across an unknown aircraft whose description matched the Do 335's, flying at maximum speed at treetop level. Detecting the British aircraft, the German pilot reversed course to evade. Two pilots fired on the Dornier but Clostermann, despite the Tempests' considerable low altitude speed, decided not to attempt to chase it as it was obviously much faster.

Proposed developments

Do 635
In 1944, Junkers helped Dornier with work on the Do 335 Zwilling or Dornier Do 635. A meeting was arranged between Junkers and Heinkel engineers, and after the meeting, they began work on the project, named 1075 01-21. The designer, Professor Heinrich Hertel, planned a test flight in late 1945. At the end of 1944, the Germans reviewed aircraft designs with the Japanese military. Among other projects, the Do 635 impressed the Japanese military with its capabilities and design. This design consisted of two Do 335 fuselages, joined by a common centre wing section, with two Rb 50 cameras in the port fuselage for aerial photography. Armament was confined to provision for five  photo-flash bombs. The mainwheels were common with Ju 352 wheels.  It was also intended that two monopropellant Walter Starthilfe RATOG units would be fitted. In early 1945, a wind-tunnel model was tested, and a cockpit mockup was constructed, but the project was cancelled in February 1945, due to the desperate war situation.

P 256
The P 256 was to meet a Luftwaffe requirement issued 27 February 1945. It was designed to carry a crew of three (pilot, radar operator, and navigator), with pilot and radar operator together under the canopy, while the navigator was in the fuselage, an idea copied from Arado. Departing from centerline thrust, it was to have two Heinkel HeS 011 engines of  each, podded under the wings in the fashion of the Me 262. The low-mounted wing was unswept, and had an aspect ratio of 5.8:1. Designed armament was four  MK 108 cannon in the nose. A field conversion kit was to retrofit two MK 108s in a Schräge Musik configuration. A fighter-bomber variant would have carried two  bombs. Endurance with  fuel was calculated as 2.6 hours. Its electronics would have included FuG 24SE with ZVG 24, FuG 29, FuG 25a or c, and FuG 244 Bremen with Gnome weapon triggers. Criticized for having poor cross-sectional area and unduly large tail surfaces, it was not adopted.

Variants

Built
 Do 335 A-0 : 10 pre-production aircraft.
 Do 335 A-1 : Single-seat fighter-bomber aircraft.
Proposed
 Do 335 A-2: single-seat fighter-bomber aircraft with new weapon sights, later proposed longer wing and updated  DB603L engines.
 Do 335 A-3: single-seat reconnaissance aircraft built from A-1 aircraft, later proposed with longer wing.
 Do 335 A-4: single-seat reconnaissance aircraft with smaller cameras than the A-3
 Do 335 A-5: single-seat night fighter aircraft, later night and bad weather fighter with enlarged wing and DB603L engines.
 Do 335 A-6: two-seat night fighter aircraft, with completely separate second cockpit located above and behind the original.
 Do 335 A-7: A-6 with longer wing.
 Do 335 A-8: A-4 fitted with longer wing.
 Do 335 A-9: A-4 fitted with longer wing, DB603L engines and pressurized cockpit.
 Do 335 B-1: abandoned in development.
 Do 335 B-2: single-seat destroyer aircraft. Fitted with 2 additional MK 103 in the wings and provision to carry two standard Luftwaffe 300 litre (80 US gal) drop tanks.
 Do 335 B-3: updated B-1 but with longer wing.
 Do 335 B-4: update of the B-1 with longer wing, DB603L engine.
 Do 335 B-6: night fighter.
 Do 335 B-12: dual-seat trainer version for the B-series aircraft.
 Do 435: a Do 335 with the redesigned, longer wing. Allied intelligence reports from early May 1945 mention spotting a Do 435 at the Dornier factory airfield at Lowenthal.
 Do 535: actually the He 535, once the Dornier P254 design was handed over to Heinkel in October 1944; fitted with jet engine in place of rear piston engine 
 Do 635: twin-fuselaged long-range reconnaissance version. Also called Junkers Ju 635 or Do 335Z. Mock up only.
 P 256: turbojet nightfighter version, with two podded HeS 011 turbojet engines, based on Do 335 airframe.

Surviving aircraft
Only one Do 335 survives, the second preproduction Do 335 A-0, designated A-02, with construction number (Werknummer) 240 102, and factory radio code registration, or Stammkennzeichen, of VG+PH. The aircraft was assembled at the Dornier plant in Oberpfaffenhofen, Bavaria on 16 April 1945. It was captured by Allied forces at the plant on 22 April 1945. VG+PH was one of two Do 335s to be shipped to the United States aboard the Royal Navy escort carrier , along with other captured German aircraft, to be used for testing and evaluation under a USAAF program called "Operation Lusty". One Do 335 (registration FE-1012) went to the USAAF and was tested in early 1946 at Freeman Field, Indiana, USA. Its fate is not recorded.

VG+PH went to the Navy for evaluation and was sent to the Test and Evaluation Center, Patuxent River Naval Air Station, Maryland, USA. Following testing from 1945 to 1948, the aircraft languished in outside storage at Naval Air Station Norfolk. In 1961, it was donated to the Smithsonian's National Air Museum, though it remained in deteriorating condition at Norfolk for several more years before being moved to the National Air and Space Museum's storage facility in Suitland, Maryland. In October 1974, VG+PH was returned to the Dornier plant in Oberpfaffenhofen, Germany (then building the Alpha Jet) for a complete restoration. In 1975, the aircraft was restored by Dornier employees, many of whom had worked on the airplane originally. They were surprised that the explosive charges built into the aircraft to blow off the dorsal fin and rear propeller prior to pilot ejection were still installed and active 30 years later.

Following restoration the completed Do 335 was displayed at the Hannover, Germany Airshow from 1 May to 9 May 1976. After the air show, the aircraft was loaned to the Deutsches Museum in Munich, where it was on display until 1988, when it was shipped back to Silver Hill, Maryland. VG+PH can be seen today in the Steven F. Udvar-Hazy Center of the National Air and Space Museum alongside other unique late-war German aircraft that also accompanied the Do 335 aboard the Royal Navy escort carrier  for shipment to the United States nearly eight decades earlier, such as the only known example of the Arado Ar 234 B-2 Blitz jet reconnaissance-bomber, and the fully restored fuselage and tail surfaces of the only complete surviving Heinkel He 219A Uhu (Eagle-Owl) night fighter (the wings and engines/nacelles are still undergoing restoration).

Specifications (Do 335 A-1)

See also

References

Notes

Bibliography
 Angelucci, Enzo. The Rand McNally Encyclopedia of Military Aircraft, 1914–1980. San Diego, California: The Military Press, 1983. .
 

 Wilson, Stewart. Aircraft of WWII. Fyshwick, ACT, Australia: Aerospace Publications Pty Ltd., 1998. .

External links

 YouTube video of Do 335, containing much WW II-vintage footage of prototype testing
 YouTube video with additional, original WW II video of the Do 335 in flight/on ground
 German-narrated video retrospective of the Do 335, & Smithsonian's restored Do 335 example coming to the USA
 German-language video of the Do 335A

Do 335
1940s German fighter aircraft
World War II fighter aircraft of Germany
Twin-engined push-pull aircraft
Low-wing aircraft
Cruciform tail aircraft
Aircraft first flown in 1943
Twin-engined piston aircraft